Helena Sofia Engman (born 16 June 1976 in Piteå) is a Swedish shot putter.

She finished sixth at the 2003 Summer Universiade and eighth at the 2007 European Indoor Championships. She also competed at the 2006 European Championships and the 2007 World Championships without reaching the finals. She achieved a personal best throw of 17.72 metres in June 2007 in Turin – a Swedish record.

She improved her national record to 18.17 m in August 2010, bringing her fourth place at the Folksam Grand Prix.

Achievements

References

External links
 
 

1976 births
Living people
People from Piteå
Swedish female shot putters
Sportspeople from Norrbotten County